Taras Dmytrovych Borovets (March 9, 1908 – May 15, 1981) was a Ukrainian resistance leader during World War II. He is better known as Taras Bulba-Borovets after his nom de guerre Taras Bulba. His pseudonym is taken from the eponymous novel by the Ukrainian writer Nikolai Gogol.

Early years
Borovets was born in the village Bystrychi of Rovensky Uyezd, Volhynian Governorate, Russian Empire. According to some data, his real name was Maxim. As a result of the Peace of Riga of 1921, this part of Volhynia was annexed to Poland. In his memoirs, Borovets claimed that from the year 1933 he worked for the government of the UNR in exile and carried out illegal missions on the territory of the Soviet Union. According to the documents of the Polish police, in 1933 he headed the cell of the OUN in his native village. In 1934, after the murder of the Polish interior minister Bronisław Pieracki by OUN assassin, Borovets was arrested and sentenced to three years in Bereza Kartuska Detention Camp. Some historians believe that he was quickly released in 1935 for good behavior, others that this was due to the help of German intelligence. Nevertheless, he remained on suspicion and in 1937 was forced to leave the border area and go deep into Poland.

After the Nazi invasion of Poland, he managed to get to the German occupied part of Poland, the General Government, and in Warsaw got in touch with members of the Ukrainian People's Republic, who told him to return to the area of Sarny, which he did in August 1940.
Afterward, after Soviet annexation of Western Ukrainian lands to the Ukrainian SSR Borovets organized an underground anti-Soviet resistance in Volhynia.

Organization of the Polissian Sich

After the German attack on the USSR at the beginning of July 1941 he was appointed by the Germans as the chief of Ukrainian militia in Sarny district. The command of the 213. Sicherungs-Division, to which Borovets addressed, gave him permission to form the "Polissian Sich" with a thousand men on August 8, 1941. The question, whether this formation was a prototype of the first Ukrainian Insurgent Army (UPA), is debatable. It was highly praised by Germans for cruel massacres of retreating Soviet Army soldiers, but later was officially disbanded and forced to go into underground. Borovets rejected German demands that his troops participate in the massacres of Jews in the area of Olevsk, but they nevertheless did participate in this massacre. At the end of 1941, the Sich's newspaper announced that "now the parasitical Jewish nation has been destroyed". During the Sich pogroms at Olevsk, the robbing, torture, and murder of Jews was done with no German involvement. After the disbandment of the Polissian Sich, Borovets went into the woods near his native village with a small group of supporters (about 100 men).

First UPA
In 1942, groups under Borovets command began to show hostility towards the Germans. In June 1942, Borovets wrote a letter to Reichskommissar Erich Koch, accusing him of crimes and looting of Ukrainians. Borovets and his people helped the peasants, preventing the Germans from exploiting the country, and they executed combat operations. The Sich's best-known operation took place at Shepetivka on 19 August.  Borovets himself claimed that he "had spilled no German blood". On 15 September 1942, "The law of an Ukrainian Partisan" was published in which partisan detachments of Borovets were called "Ukrainian Insurgent Army". In September 1942, Borovets entered into negotiations with Soviet partisans of D. Medvedev. They tried to attract him to the struggle against the Germans but could not reach an agreement, because Borovets refused to obey the Soviet command and feared the reciprocal repression of Germans against Ukrainian civilians. Nevertheless, until the spring of 1943 neutrality was maintained between the Borovets detachments and the Soviet partisans.

Parallel to the negotiations with the Soviets, Borovets continued to try to reach an agreement with the Germans. In November 1942, there was a meeting with Obersturmbannführer Dr. Puts, the head of the security service of Volhynia and Podolia general district. Putz said that the negotiations took place only because Borovets never gave orders to "spill German blood". He demanded Borovets and his man to go to the service of the Germans and join the fight against the Soviet partisans. Subsequently, the negotiations were continued in correspondence. Borovets demanded the release of arrested Ukrainian nationalists and put forward political demands, but was refused.
In March 1943, Borovets wrote that the struggle against the Soviets was vital. He set out the principles on which cooperation could be based:
 The Germans are changing their attitude towards the Ukrainians, and they are starting to fight against the Bolsheviks.
 The Germans provide military equipment, and Ukrainians give people.
 Cooperation is temporarily formalized as an "independent Ukrainian partisan movement".
Borovets also promised to provide 40,000 people, but all these proposals were ignored.

Ukrainian People's Revolutionary Army
February 22, 1943 Taras Bulba-Borovets began negotiations with the leaders of OUN (B) to unite all nationalist movements of Ukraine. The UPA was to become the military organization of the united forces, and representatives of the OUN (B) were to enter the common general staff. Borovets rejected the claims of the banderites to full domination and put forward a series of charges against them. In May, the banderites interrupted the negotiations without explanation, but began to call their armed detachments "UPA". On Jule 20, 1943, the UPA of Borovets changed its name to Ukrainian National Revolutionary Army.

Borovets opposed against senseless terror against national minorities, in particular the Poles, in his statements. He wrote: 

Despite this, Borovets could not stop the escalation of the ethnic conflict and his people were involved in the actions against the Poles. When Borovets refused to join the forces of Stepan Bandera's faction, his troops were attacked and partly destroyed, partly subordinated to OUN (B). Presumably, the first wife of Borovets ( Czech woman Anna Opochens’ka), was captured and killed by them. According to one of the testimonies, two members of the OUN (B) with a laugh recalled that she was hanged and then "swung and dangled for a long time as her legs twisted about". Borovets and his staff were forced to withdraw to the territory under control of Soviet partisans. In September, this group was defeated, and he was barely managed to escape. 5 October 1943 Borovets ordered to disband his troops and go to underground. In November, he abandoned his forces, which by that time became a tiny demoralized group, and went to seek German assistance in Warsaw.

End of World War II and emigration
In November 1943 during negotiations with the Germans Borovets was arrested by the Gestapo in Warsaw and incarcerated in Sachsenhausen concentration camp. In Autumn 1944 the Nazis, looking for Ukrainian support in the war they were losing, freed Borovets. He was forced to change his nom de guerre to Kononenko and under this name he led the formation of a Ukrainian special forces detachment in the structure of the Waffen-SS (around 50 men). This detachment should have been dropped in the rear of the Red Army for guerrilla warfare. Those plans never came to fruition and in the end of war Ukrainian nationalist allies of Hitler demanded being transferred away from the Eastern Front to be able to surrender to allies. Borovets' detachment surrendered to the allies on May 10, 1945, and were interned in Rimini (Italy).

It is commonly believed that he emigrated to Canada or USA in 1948. However, according to the internal documents of the Soviet secret service, which continued to hunt Borovets and his associates until 1969, he remained in West Germany for some time. According to these reports, he worked in the American intelligence school and even traveled to the United States to meet with CIA director Allen Dulles in 1953.

In emigration he organized the Ukrainian National Guard and published a newspaper Mech i Volia (Sword and Freedom), along with a book of memoirs "Armiya bez Derzhavy" (Army without a country). He died in Toronto, Ontario, Canada and is buried at the cemetery of St. Andrew Memorial Church in Bound Brook, New Jersey.

Legacy 
In 2014, the American historian Jared McBride criticized a plaque to Bulba-Borovets in a Tablet article titled, "Ukrainian Holocaust Perpetrators Are Being Honored in Place of Their Victims".

In late March 2019 former members of Polissian Sich and the Ukrainian People's Revolutionary Army were officially granted the status of veterans in Ukraine. This meant that for the first time they could receive veteran benefits, including free public transport, subsidized medical services, annual monetary aid, and public utilities discounts (and will enjoy the same social benefits as former Ukrainian soldiers of the Red Army of the Soviet Union).

There had been several previous attempts to provide former Ukrainian nationalist fighters with official veteran status, especially during the 2005-2009 administration President Viktor Yushenko, but all failed.

References

Sources
 Son of Polissia
 Army without country
 Taras Borovetz History of the UIA 
 Taras Borovetz - Our opinion of Russia and General Vlasov 
  

1908 births
1981 deaths
People from Rivne Oblast
People from Volhynian Governorate
Organization of Ukrainian Nationalists
Sachsenhausen concentration camp survivors
Ukrainian diaspora in Canada
Ukrainian people imprisoned abroad
Inmates of Bereza Kartuska Prison
Ukrainian collaborators with Nazi Germany